God of Black, stylized as GXX XX BXXXK Volume. 1 is a  mixtape by American hip hop musician SpaceGhostPurrp. It was released for free on February 3, 2012, months before his debut album Mysterious Phonk: The Chronicles of SpvcxGhxztPvrrp.

Critical reception
Shortly after the mixtape's release, British music magazine Fact gave God of Black a 3.5 of 5 in February 2012, stating that with "God Of Black Purrrp does things by himself, for himself, with mixed results".

As 2012 concluded, Fact rated God of Black its 5th best album in its The 50 Best Albums of 2012 article, stating:

Track listing

References

2012 albums
SpaceGhostPurrp albums